Pedro Damiano (Damiano is the Italian form, much like the Latin Damianus; 1480–1544) was a Portuguese chess player. A native of Odemira, he was a pharmacist by profession. He wrote Questo libro e da imparare giocare a scachi et de li partiti, published in Rome, Italy, in 1512; it went through eight editions in the sixteenth century. Damiano describes the rules of the game, offers advice on strategy, presents a selection of chess problems (see diagrams), and provides analyses of a few openings. It is the oldest book that definitely states that the square on the right of the row closest to each player must be white. He also offers advice regarding blindfold chess, principally focused on the need to master notation based on numbering the squares 1–64 .

In this book Damiano suggested chess was invented by Xerxes, which would be the reason why it was known in Portuguese as xadrez and in Spanish as ajedrez. In fact, these words come from Sanskrit caturaṅga via Arabic šaṭranj.

The well-known chess aphorism "If you see a good move, try to find a better one", sometimes misattributed to Lasker and other writers, can be found in Damiano's book; similar sentiments were expressed by al-Suli regarding shatranj, the Persian precursor to chess.

Chess openings

In his opening analysis, Damiano suggested that after 1.e4 e5 2.Nf3 the reply 2...Nc6 is best and 2...d6 (now called the Philidor Defence) is not as good. He rightly condemned 2...f6 as clearly inferior, noting that White can play 3.Nxe5 with advantage; however, the opening later came to be known as the Damiano Defence. He stated that 1.e4 and 1.d4 are the only good first moves and that 1.e4 is better. He examined the Giuoco Piano, Petrov's Defence, and the Queen's Gambit Accepted.

Chess problems

Notes

References

 Questo libro e da imparare giocare a scachi et de li partiti at Gallica, the digital archives of the Bibliothèque nationale de France

1480 births
1544 deaths
People from Odemira
15th-century Portuguese people
16th-century Portuguese people
Portuguese chess players
16th-century chess players
Chess writers
Chess theoreticians